The Miner's Cup is the trophy awarded to the winner of the college football game between the  and the . There has been a rivalry between the two teams since 1920, but the tradition of a "traveling trophy" between the two schools has only been around since 2002; Tech has won the trophy 17 out of a possible 20 times since the tradition was begun.

History 
A rivalry between the two universities has been around since 1920. Since then, they have met 94 times, with the series record at 49-41-5 in Michigan Tech's favor.  The tradition of a "traveling trophy" did not begin until 2002, when Michigan Tech’s Athletics Department and its Army ROTC Battalion combined to create it. The trophy itself is an antique miner's helmet mounted on a wooden base. The helmet was found at an antique store in the Houghton, Michigan area.

Game results

See also 
Superior Dome

References

College football rivalry trophies in the United States
Michigan Tech Huskies football
Northern Michigan Wildcats football